Christina Joy Barton  (born 1958), known as Tina Barton, is a New Zealand art historian, curator and gallery director. She is currently director of the Adam Art Gallery.

Education

Barton completed a Masters of Art in art history at the University of Auckland in 1987. Her thesis topic was the history of post-object art in New Zealand between 1969 and 1979.

Career

After completing her MA, Barton joined the Auckland Art Gallery as a research assistant. She worked as Assistant Curator at Auckland Art Gallery from 1988 to 1992, and as Curator of Contemporary New Zealand Art at the Museum of New Zealand Te Papa Tongarewa from 1992 to 1994. During her time at Te Papa Barton curated Art Now, a major survey exhibition of contemporary New Zealand art practice intended to become a biennial event, a hope which did not materialize. She also co-curated, with Deborah Lawlor-Dormer, Alter / Image: Feminism and representation in New Zealand art 1973–1993, an exhibition organised to mark the centennial of women's suffrage in New Zealand.

From 1995 to 2007, Barton lectured in the Art History department at Victoria University of Wellington. During this time she continued to curate exhibitions, including Guests and Foreigners, Rules and Meanings (Te Kore), a major installation by Joseph Kosuth at the then-recently opened Adam Art Gallery at Victoria University.

Barton was appointed director of the Adam Art Gallery in April 2007. Significant exhibitions she has curated for the gallery include:

I, HERE, NOW: Vivian Lynn (2007) 
Anthony McCall: Drawing with Light (2010)
Dark Sky (2012) (with Geoffrey Batchen)
Beautiful Creatures: Jack Smith, Bill Henson, Jacqueline Fraser (2013)
Simon Denny: The Personal Effects of Kim Dotcom

In 2014, Barton co-edited a major anthology of art critic Wystan Curnow's writing with curator Robert Leonard. The Critic's Part: Wystan Curnow Art Writings 1971–2013 was published by Victoria University Press and described by critic Jill Trevelyan as 'more than a collection of essays: it serves as an insight into the development of New Zealand art, illuminating a period of rapid change'. In the same year she was a juror for the 2014 Walters Prize.

In 2015, Barton curated Billy Apple®: The Artist Has to Live Like Everybody Else, a survey exhibition of Billy Apple's work for Auckland Art Gallery. Barton has worked consistently with Apple; previous exhibitions include The Expatriates: Frances Hodgkins and Barrie Bates in 2004 and Billy Apply: New York 1969–1973 in 2009, both at the Adam Art Gallery.

In the 2021 New Year Honours, Barton was appointed a Member of the New Zealand Order of Merit, for services to art history and curation.

Publications

Billy Apple® : a Life in Parts, Auckland: Auckland Art Gallery, 2015.  
Tina Barton and Robert Leonard, with Thomasin Sleigh, The critic's part : Wystan Curnow art writings 1971–2013, Wellington: Victoria University Press, 2014. 
Beautiful Creatures: Jack Smith, Bill Henson, Jacqueline Fraser, Wellington: Adam Art Gallery, 2013.
I, here, now / Vivian Lynn, Wellington: Adam Art Gallery, 2010.  
The expatriates: Frances Hodgkins and Barrie Bates , Wellington: Adam Art Gallery, 2004. 
Ground/work: The art of Pauline Rhodes, Wellington:  Adam Art Gallery & Victoria University Press, 2002. 
Joseph Kosuth Guests and Foreigners, Rules and Meanings (Te Kore), Wellington: Adam Art Gallery, 2000. 
 Art now : the first biennial review of contemporary art, Wellington: Museum of New Zealand Te Papa Tongarewa, 1994. 
 Tina Barton and Deborah Lawler-Dormer, Alter/image : feminism and representation in New Zealand art, 1973–1993, Wellington: Wellington City Art Gallery, 1993. 
Surface tension : ten artists in the '90s, Auckland: Auckland Art Gallery, 1992. 
Louise Henderson : the cubist years, 1946–1958, Auckland: Auckland Art Gallery, 1991.  
After McCahon : some configurations in recent art, Auckland: Auckland Art Gallery 1989.

Articles

'Image/World : recent work by Andrew Beck', Art New Zealand, no. 156, Summer 2015/2016, pp. 68–71  
'Round table : the state of art and discourse in New Zealand', Reading Room, Auckland: Auckland Art Gallery, 2009   
'Not getting it', New Zealand Books, vol. 18, no. 3, Spring 2008, p. 7
'New horizons : New Zealand in Venice', Art New Zealand, no. 101, Summer 2001/2002, pp. 41–44,90–91
'Hammond's place', Art New Zealand, no. 97, Summer 2000/2001, pp. 66–69
'Joseph Kosuth in New Zealand', Art New Zealand, no. 96, Spring 2000, pp. 60–64
'Slipping through the net of art history', New Zealand Books, vol. 8, no. 4, October 1998, pp. 8–9
'Pushing the envelope : developments at the Govett-Brewster Art Gallery', Art New Zealand, no. 87, Winter 1998, pp. 56–59
'Vivian Lynn's Semi(r)otics', Art New Zealand, no. 79, Winter 1996, pp. 54–57 
'Uncanny spaces : recent paintings by Caroline Williams', Art New Zealand, no. 75, Winter 1995, pp. 57–59 
'Ten years on : reviewing the terrain for women in art in New Zealand', Art New Zealand, no. 68, Spring 1993, pp. 50–52  
'David Tremlett at Artspace : a model for cultural exchange', Art New Zealand, no. 65, Summer 1992/1993, pp. 60–63 
'Pleasures and dangers', Stamp, no. 29, March 1992, p. 30 
'The last small world : Jim Allen's NZ environment No. 5', Midwest, no. 1,1992, pp. 29–31 
Christina Barton and Priscilla Pitts, 'Unearthing nature : land projects by 4 artists, 1969–1980', Antic, no. 5, June 1989, pp. 75–96

Further information
Interview with Tina Barton, RNZ National, 14 September 2009

References

New Zealand art historians
Directors of museums in New Zealand
Living people
University of Auckland alumni
1958 births
People associated with the Museum of New Zealand Te Papa Tongarewa
Academic staff of the Victoria University of Wellington
New Zealand art curators
Members of the New Zealand Order of Merit
New Zealand women curators